The Colombo Marathon, officially known as the LSR Colombo Marathon and formerly known as the LSR International Marathon, is a marathon held annually since 1998 in Colombo, capital city of Sri Lanka. It is a permanent member of Association of International Marathons and Distance Races (AIMS). It also has voting rights in AIMS, which makes it one of 56 races out of 110 worldwide with that right.

History
In the late 1990s, Sri Lankan tour operator LSR decided to start an international marathon in Sri Lanka because there was no such event in Sri Lanka at that time. The first marathon, the "LSR International Marathon", was held in the city of Galle in 1998. The host city of the marathon subsequently changed to Negombo, Kandy, and then Dambulla, before Sri Lanka's capital Colombo hosted the event for the first time in 2004. In 2006 the name of marathon was changed to the "LSR Colombo Marathon".

Organization
Travel agent and tour operator company Lanka Sportreizen (LSR) is the organizer and primary sponsor of the marathon. The event is also supported by the Ministry of Tourism, the Ministry of Youth Affairs, the Ministry of Education, and the Ministry of Sport, along with Sri Lankan Airlines and the Sri Lanka Police Service. Technical assistance is provided by the Athletic Association of Sri Lanka. Some of the key objectives of the marathon are to promote recreational activities in Sri Lanka and to promote Sri Lanka as safe and ideal place for tourism and sports.

Participants and prize
The 2015 edition of the marathon hosted around 7,000 runners from more than 30 countries, who participated in various categories. The prize money for the event was increased from 2014 to encourage an increase in participation, with the prize money for winner of full marathon increasing from $1,500 (US) to $2,500 (US). The event includes a special full and half marathons for men and women over 50 years in addition to a "fun run" of 5 and 10 km for youth aged more than 15 years.

Course
The full marathon starts at the headquarters of the Ministry of Sports and proceeds through the suburbs of Borella, Dematagoda, Peliyagoda, Wattala, along the Hamilton Canal, Pamunugama, Thalahena, Pitipana and Duwa, finishing at the Negombo Beach Park.

Results

References

Marathons in Sri Lanka
Athletics competitions in Sri Lanka
Recurring sporting events established in 1998